Dharmapuri Arvind (born 25 August 1976) is an Indian politician who is the current Member of Parliament in the Lok Sabha from Nizamabad,  Telangana. He played first-class cricket match for Hyderabad in 1995/96. He is the youngest of two sons of D. Srinivas who served as a three time Congress MLA from Nizamabad.

Early life and background
Aravind's father D. Srinivas served as a Member of Parliament (Rajya Sabha) and a minister for the state of Andhra Pradesh. His father also served as the president of Andhra Pradesh Congress Committee. His grandfather, Dharmapuri Venkat Ram, was a member of Jan Sangh. Arvind's family belongs to the Munnuru Kapu community, which is categorized as an Other Backward Class by the Indian government.

Cricket career
Aravind represented Hyderabad in Ranji Trophy, under 19, 21, 23, 25 segments, Moin-ud-Dowlah and also for Under-19 South India as an Opening Batsman.

Political career
He defeated former TRS MP K. Kavitha, the daughter of Telangana Chief Minister, K. Chandrashekar Rao while defeating world record 184 candidates from Nizamabad Lok Sabha Constituency.

Arvind played a key role in establishing a regional Centre of the Spices Board in Nizamabad. In February 2020, the Union Minister for Commerce and Industry Piyush Goyal announced the regional centre with an IAS officer as its director. The board is tasked to provide necessary assistance to the turmeric farmers, bringing them some relief.

Philanthropy
Arvind founded the Arvind Dharmapuri Foundation, a personal initiative, in the year 2013 to save critically ill impoverished children under the age of 12. The Foundation is marching towards 200 cases, and its services go uninterrupted irrespective of his political milieu.

Key positions held

See also
 List of Hyderabad cricketers

References

External links
 

1976 births
Living people
Indian cricketers
Hyderabad cricketers
People from Nizamabad, Telangana
India MPs 2019–present
Bharatiya Janata Party politicians from Telangana